Sylwia Julito (28 March 1929 – 14 December 2012) was a Polish fencer. She competed in the women's individual and team foil events at the 1960 Summer Olympics.

She moved to Germany in 1983, where she died on 14 December 2012, at the age of 83.

References

External links
 

1929 births
2012 deaths
Polish female fencers
Olympic fencers of Poland
Fencers at the 1960 Summer Olympics
People from Świętochłowice
Sportspeople from Silesian Voivodeship
20th-century Polish women
21st-century Polish women